The Stoney Creek Generals were a Canadian senior ice hockey team playing out of Gateway Ice Centre in Stoney Creek, Ontario. In 2013, the Stoney Creek Generals joined the Ontario Hockey Association's Allan Cup Hockey League and began operations. The Stoney Creek Generals won the J. Ross Robertson Cup as the league's playoffs champions in four consecutive seasons from 2016 to 2019.

Season-by-season record
Note: GP = Games Played, W = Wins, L = Losses, T = Ties, OTL = Overtime Losses, SOL = Shootout Losses, Pts = Points, GF = Goals for, GA = Goals against, PIM = Penalties in minutes

Source: pointstreak.com

Awards
2015/2016 - Regular Season Champions
2015/2016 - ACH Awards - Leading Scorer: Mike Ruberto
2015/2016 - Robertson Cup Champions
2016/2017 - November 2016 Player of the Month: Matthew Dzieduszycki
2016/2017 - Regular Season Champions
2016/2017 - ACH Awards - Best Defenceman Award: Sean Blanchard
2016/2017 - ACH Awards - Best Individual Goaltender Award: Daniel Svedin
2016/2017 - ACH Awards - Best Goaltending Award: Daniel Svedin, Matthew Sagrott & David Brown
2016/2017 - Robertson Cup Champions

Notable players 
Sean Blanchard
Dave Brown
Justin Donati
Tyler Donati
Matt Dzieduszycki
Kellan Lain 
Stefan Legein
David Ling
Ryan O'Marra
Justin Sawyer

References

External links
Official web site
Regular season champions article

Ice hockey teams in Hamilton, Ontario
2013 establishments in Ontario
Ice hockey clubs established in 2013
Senior ice hockey teams